Satyameba Jayate is a 2008 Indian Bengali-language film directed by Milan Bhowmik and produced by Ashok Kumar Bed and Soma Bhowmik, starring Mithun Chakraborty, Puneet Issar, Seemran, Tania and Priyadarshini

Plot

Satyameva Jayate is the story of a traffic constable who witnesses a murder committed by a politician's son in day light and the reactions he had to face when he tries to bring the culprits to book. As a bunch of dishonest bureaucrats and corrupted cops acts against him, he had to turn into the long-haired, local goon Pandiya to take revenge.

Cast

Mithun Chakraborty as constable Vinayak/Pandeya
Puneet Issar as corrupt minister M. P. Yadav
Shankar Chakraborty as corrupt police officer Chakradhar
Sanjib Dasgupta as corrupt DGP Ghoshal
Joy Badlani as ACP Ashok Chakraborty
Lokesh Ghosh as Vinayak's friend
Shyamal Dutta
Anamika Saha as Vinayak's mother
Biplab Chatterjee as a lawyer
Suman Dey, newsreader of Star Ananda, guest appearance

References

External links
 gomolo.in
www.telegraphindia.com preview

2008 films
Bengali-language Indian films
2000s Bengali-language films